Sorung is an extinct language of the island Erromango in Vanuatu. It has sometimes been classified as a dialect of Sie.

References

Languages of Vanuatu
South Vanuatu languages
Extinct languages of Oceania